Hounslow Hockey Club was a field hockey club based at Duke's Meadows, Chiswick, West London and was formed in 1901, initially playing at a variety of locations in the Hounslow Area until becoming a section of Hounslow Cricket and Sports Club, sited at Church Meadow in Hounslow West, circa 1923. The Ladies Hockey club formally became a member of Hounslow Cricket and Sports Club in 1925.

In 1936 the club merged with the Brondesbury Club, enabling access to fixtures with the leading teams in the sport. The resulting Hounslow and Brondesbury continued playing, with great success, until being disbanded during World War 2. The club restarted in 1945-46 as Hounslow Hockey Club, continuing to be based at Church Meadow until 1993, when the Club separated from Hounslow Cricket and Sports Club and relocated to Duke's Meadow, where a purpose built water based synthetic pitch had been constructed.

During the period from the late 1950s onwards the men's section became one of the premier hockey clubs in the country, with much success in the London League and subsequently, following its formation, in the National League. The Club also achieved great success in cup hockey, with multiple wins in the Hockey Association Cup and the European Cup in 1990.

The move to Duke's Meadow provided access to a first class pitch and the success of the men's 1st XI continued into the mid-nineties. However, during this period membership numbers of both men's and women's sections declined. Retirement of many key members of the men's 1st XI, who could not be easily replaced, resulted in relegation through the leagues and loss of status, reinforcing the difficulty in recruiting new members.

In 2000-2001 season the club merged with Ealing Ladies Hockey Club to form Hounslow and Ealing Ladies Hockey Club but this failed to stem the gradual decline of the club. In 2005 the club went out of existence, with the men's section joining Richmond Hockey Club and the women's section merging with Barnes Hockey Club, playing for a period under the name of Barnes Hounslow and Ealing, before reverting to simply Barnes Hockey Club.

Major Honours
The club was hugely successful and gained significant honours -
 1975 National Indoor Club Champions
 1978 National Indoor Club Champions
 1989-90 National League Champions
 1992-93 National League Champions
 1989 National League Cup winners
 1991 National League Cup winners
 1994 National League Cup winners
 1989 Heineken Trophy winners 
 1990 Heineken Trophy winners
 1971-72 Cup winners
 1972-73 Cup winners
 1988-89 Cup winners
 [[1990–91 England Hockey Le
ague season|1990-91 Cup winners]]
 1991-92 Cup winners
 1992-93 Cup winners
 1989-90 Inaugural winners of European Cup Winners Cup

Men's International players past and present

References

English field hockey clubs
Field hockey clubs established in 1901
1901 establishments in England